Tim Remington is an American pastor and politician from Coeur d'Alene, Idaho.

Career 
Remington is a pastor at Altar Church in Coeur d'Alene.

On January 28, 2020, Remington was appointed by Idaho Governor Brad Little as a Republican member of Idaho House of Representatives for District 2, seat B. Remington replaced John Green, who was expelled from the Idaho Legislature.

Personal life 
Remington lives in Coeur d'Alene, Idaho.

On March 6, 2016, Kyle Odom, an individual fixated with alien conspiracy theories, shot Remington six times in the back and once in the head at Altar Church. Remington survived and underwent several hours of surgery. Odom mailed a manifesto to his family and media outlets, expressing his intent to murder Remington and his belief that he was part of an alien conspiracy theory to enslave humanity. Odom fled to Washington, D.C., tossed items over the White House fencing before he was apprehended and subsequently sentenced to twenty-five years in prison.

References

External links 
 Tim Remington at ballotpedia.org

Living people
Republican Party members of the Idaho House of Representatives
21st-century American politicians
Religious leaders from Idaho
Year of birth missing (living people)